Crashdog was one of the first Christian punk bands and was active primarily in the early 1990s.  Most of their albums were released by Grrr Records, which has also been home to Headnoise, Resurrection Band, and Glenn Kaiser, among others.

Crashdog were known for their very direct lyrics, which they used to make social commentaries and discuss political issues of their day.  Their albums included both strongly Christian songs and overtly political songs, often with a liberal bent.  They were one of the first Christian bands to do this; later Christian old-school punk and hardcore bands later followed suit.

After their 1998 release, 8 Years to Nowhere a selection of songs from previous recordings (originally called 8 Years from Nowhere to Nowhere), they decided to go on a one-year hiatus because their drummer, Greg Jacques along with Matt Switaj of The Blamed, was starting a new record label, 2 Jake Records.

During their hiatus, they started another band called Ballydowse, which featured a mix of Celtic music and punk rock (though they were not a "Celtic punk" band along the lines of Flogging Molly or the Dropkick Murphys).  As of 2006, they still consider themselves to be on an "indefinite hiatus", but it is unlikely that they will re-form as a band.

Crashdog did reform to do shows for Cornerstone in 2012

Members
 Andrew Mandell - lead vocals (originally played guitar)
 Greg Jacques - drums
 Brian Grover - bass
 Jason Burt - guitar
 Mike Perlmutter - guitar

Former members
 Spike Nard (born Tim Davis) - lead vocals
 Mike Simicek - bass

Discography
 Hard Knocks for Hard Heads (Grrr records/Rrrough, 1990)
 Humane Society (Grrr recordS/Word Entertainment, 1990)
 The Pursuit of Happiness (Grrr recordS/Word Entertainment, 1993)
 Mud Angels (Grrr recordS/R.E.X. Music, 1994)
 Cashists Fascists and Other Fungus (Grrr recordS/R.E.X. Music, 1995)
 Outer Crust (2 Jake Records/Grrr records, 1997)
 8 Years to Nowhere (Grrr recordS, 1998)
 Live at Cornerstone 2002 (authorized indie CDR)

References

External links
 Crashdog homepage
 Band's statement on their hiatus
 Ballydowse archive at the Crashdog website
 Video of Crashdog show at Cornerstone 96

Christian punk groups